George Noonan may refer to:

 George H. Noonan (1828–1907), U.S. Representative from Texas
 George Garry Noonan, state legislator in Illinois
 George Noonan (footballer) (1894–1972), Australian rules footballer